The 1904 municipal election was held December 12, 1904 for the purpose of electing a mayor and eight aldermen to sit on the Edmonton City Council, as well as five public school trustees and five separate school trustees.  It was Edmonton's first election as a city, and the first in which there were eight aldermanic positions instead of six.  Because of this new composition of city council, all aldermanic positions were elected instead of only half as had been the case in previous elections and would again be the case in subsequent elections.  Accordingly, even though Edmund Grierson, Charles May, and Joseph Henri Picard had been elected to two-year terms in the 1903 election, their terms were truncated.  May and Picard decided to stand for re-election, while Grierson did not.

In order to re-establish staggered aldermanic terms, the top four finishers were elected to two-year terms while the next four were elected to one-year terms.

Voter turnout

There were 743 ballots cast in the 1904 election.  Information on the number of eligible voters is no longer available.

Results

(bold indicates elected, italics indicate incumbent)

Mayor

Kenneth W. MacKenzie was acclaimed as mayor.

Aldermen

Charles May - 471
John Boyle - 349
Kenneth McLeod - 330
Thomas Bellamy - 310
William Clark - 277
Joseph Henri Picard - 262
Daniel Fraser - 257
William Antrobus Griesbach - 239
Thomas Grindley - 231
Gustave Koerman
Peter Butchart - 204
Donald MacDonald - 171
William Deyl - 170
Herbert Charles Wilson - 162
Frank Haldane - 161
Samuel Paton - 143
W S Weeks - 80

Public school trustees

Arthur Cushing, H A Gray, Kenneth McLeod, Alex Taylor, and Hedley C. Taylor were elected.  Detailed results are no longer available.

Separate (Catholic) school trustees

Nicolas Dubois Dominic Beck, J Bilodeau, H Morel, Joseph Henri Picard, and J Pomerleau were elected.  Detailed results are no longer available.

References

City of Edmonton: Edmonton Elections

1904
1904 elections in Canada
1904 in Alberta